Free Agents is an American sitcom television series that premiered on NBC September 14, 2011, in the 10:30 pm Eastern/9:30 pm Central time slot, before assuming its regular time slot on September 21, 2011, where it aired at 8:30 pm Eastern/7:30 pm Central on Wednesday nights.  It is based on the British comedy series of the same name that was created by  Chris Niel, who also serves as co-creator and producer on this version with John Enbom, Karey Burke, Todd Holland, and Kenton Allen for Big Talk Productions, Dark Toy Entertainment and Universal Television. This show was the last series to be produced by Universal Media Studios during the revival of Universal Television.

On October 6, 2011, NBC cancelled the series after only four episodes were broadcast, due to low ratings. The remaining four episodes produced were later released via Hulu on January 16, 2012.

Synopsis
The series followed the lives of two public relations executives at an advertising firm in Portland, Oregon: Alex Taylor (Hank Azaria), who is recently divorced, and Helen Ryan (Kathryn Hahn), a woman trying to move on after the death of her fiancé. They discover that they seem to have an attraction for each other, and have a drunken one-night stand, but try to stay professional at work, where their friends will do anything to get them to re-enter the dating scene.

Cast and characters
 Hank Azaria as Alex Taylor
 Kathryn Hahn as Helen Ryan
 Mo Mandel as Dan Mackey
 Natasha Leggero as Emma Parker
 Al Madrigal as Gregg
 Joe Lo Truglio as Walter
 Anthony Head as Stephen Yates

Development and production
NBC took interest in this project after Executive Producer Todd Holland began developing the American adaptation with the UK's original writer Chris Niel and producers Nira Park, Kenton Allen and Matthew Justice in September 2010. They also made changes to the workplace setting from talent agents in the British version to PR executives for American viewers, after NBC greenlit the pilot in February 2011.

Actor Anthony Head was the only cast member who had ties to both shows, in which he played Stephen, the boss in the UK and US adaptations.

Episodes

Ratings

International broadcasts
The series was simulcast in Canada by CTV2.

Broadcast by TV Séries in Portugal 4 weeks after the US air date.

References

External links
 
 Official Facebook page
 Official Twitter page
 

2010s American single-camera sitcoms
2011 American television series debuts
2011 American television series endings
American television series based on British television series
English-language television shows
NBC original programming
Television shows set in Portland, Oregon
Television series by Universal Television
Television series by ITV Studios
Television series by Big Talk Productions